Yurshor (Komi and ) was a northern outpost of Vorgashor, a mining town in Russia, and part of the Vorkuta Ring of settlements. By 2018 the town had been abandoned.

There is a possibility that the village's name originates from the abbreviation of the geographical toponym Izyurvozh, which is a sub-river of the Reka Vorkuta. The name in the Komi language can be translated as "stream-tributary at the stone-head."

References 

Cities and towns in the Komi Republic
Cities and towns built in the Soviet Union
Defunct towns in Russia